Oncideres fulva is a species of beetle in the family Cerambycidae. It was described by Henry Walter Bates in 1865. It is known from Colombia, Brazil and French Guiana.

References

fulva
Beetles described in 1865